In the Back to the Future franchise, the DeLorean time machine is a time travel device made by retrofitting a DMC DeLorean vehicle with a flux capacitor, which allows for time travel when it hits 88 miles per hour.

Operation
The control of the time machine is the same in all three films. The operator is seated inside the DeLorean (except the first time, when the remote control is used), and turns on the time circuits by turning a handle near the gear lever, activating a unit containing multiple fourteen- and seven-segment displays that show the destination (red), present (green), and last departed (yellow) dates and times. After entering a target date with the keypad inside the DeLorean, the operator accelerates the car to 88mph (142km/h), which activates the flux capacitor. As it accelerates, several coils around the body glow blue/white while a burst of light appears in front of it. Surrounded by an electrical current similar to a Tesla coil, the whole car vanishes in a flash of white/blue light seconds later, leaving a pair of fiery tire tracks. A digital speedometer is attached to the dashboard so that the operator can accurately gauge the car's speed. Various proposals have been brought forth in the past by fans of the movie franchise for why the car has to be moving at 88 mph to achieve temporal displacement, but actually the production crew chose the velocity simply because they liked how it looked on the speedometer, modified for the movie. The actual speedometer on the production DeLorean's dashboard only goes up to 85 mph, and the car itself was criticized for being underpowered.

Observers outside the vehicle see an implosion of plasma as the vehicle disappears, leaving behind a trail of fire aligned with the DeLorean's tires (which can also appear in midair), while occupants within the vehicle see a quick flash of light and instantaneously arrive at the target time in the same spatial location (relative to the Earth) as when it departed. In the destination time, immediately before the car's arrival, three large and loud flashes occur at the point from which the car emerges from its time travel. After the trip, the exterior of the DeLorean is extremely cold, and frost forms from atmospheric moisture all over the car's body. Vents on the back heat the vehicle after time travel.

The DeLorean suffers assorted malfunctions and damage over the course of the trilogy. In the first film, the car has starter problems and has a hard time restarting once stopped, much to Marty's repeated frustration. In the second film, the destination time display malfunctions and begins to show a series of random dates, causing Doc to be sent back to 1885 when the DeLorean is struck by lightning with him inside. In the third film, a note left by Doc's 1885 self reveals that the DeLorean's flying circuits (added by him in 2015) were destroyed by the strike. After Marty travels back to 1885, the fuel line and fuel injection manifold both suffer damage, leaving the car unable to move under its own power.

In the first film, following Marty's accidental trip from 1985 to 1955, Doc has no access to plutonium in 1955, so he outfits the car with a large pole and hook in order to channel the power of a lightning bolt into the flux capacitor and send Marty back to 1985. During Doc's first visit to 2015, he has the machine refitted to fly in addition to standard road driving, and he replaces the nuclear reactor with a Mr. Fusion generator that uses garbage as fuel.

Although the Mr. Fusion unit provides the required power for the time machine, the DeLorean is still powered by an internal combustion engine for propulsion. The fuel line is damaged during Marty's trip to 1885 in Back to the Future Part III; after he and Doc patch it, they attempt to use whiskey as a replacement fuel since commercial gasoline is not yet available. The test fails, damaging the car's fuel injection manifold and leaving it unable to travel under its own power.

Doc and Marty consider options to reach the required 88 mph (such as pulling it with horses, which fails because the car barely breaks 30 mph) and ultimately settle on pushing the car with a steam locomotive. They replace the DeLorean's standard wheels with a set designed to mate with train rails. For the extra power needed to push it up to speed, Doc adds his own version of "Presto Logs" (a chemically treated mixture of pressed wood and anthracite) to the locomotive's boiler and chooses a location with a straight section of track long enough to achieve 88 mph.

Jigowatts
The power required is pronounced in the film as "one point twenty-one jigowatts", with a jigowatt referring to "one billion watts". The spelling of jigowatts is used in the script and was also the spelling used in the closed-captioning in earlier home video versions of the film. However, the correct spelling is "gigawatts". Although rarely used, the "j" sound at the beginning of the SI prefix "giga-" is an acceptable pronunciation. Later versions of closed captioning, such as in the 2020 DVD Trilogy release have corrected the spelling to gigawatts. In the DVD commentary for Back to the Future, Bob Gale states that he had thought it was pronounced this way because it was how a scientific adviser for the film pronounced it. The "jigowatts" spelling is used by Alan Dean Foster in the novelizations of the second and third films.

Equipment

Flux capacitor

The flux capacitor, which consists of a rectangular-shaped compartment with three flashing Geissler-style tubes arranged in a "Y" configuration, is described by Doc as "what makes time travel possible". The device is the core component of the time machine.

As the time machine nears 88 mph, light coming from the flux capacitor begins pulsing more rapidly until it becomes a steady stream. Doctor Emmet Brown originally conceived the idea for the flux capacitor on November 5, 1955, when he slipped on the edge of his toilet while hanging a clock in his bathroom and hit his head on the sink. In 1955 "Doc" had named the flux capacitor the "Flux Compresser" as shown on 1955 "Doc's" diagram  A similar, but possibly steam-powered, flux capacitor is also seen in the chimney headlamp of Doc's second time machine, the Time Machine Locomotive, at the end of Back to the Future Part III.

Although the films do not describe exactly how the flux capacitor works, Doc mentions at one point that the stainless steel body of the DeLorean has a direct and influential effect on the "flux dispersal", but he is interrupted before he can finish the explanation. The flux capacitor requires 1.21 gigawatts of electrical power to operate, which is roughly equivalent to the power produced by 15 typical commercial airplane jet engines.

The instruction manual for the AMT/ERTL DeLorean model kit says: "Because the car's stainless steel body improves the flux dispersal generated by the flux capacitor, and this in turn allows the vehicle smooth passage through the space-time continuum".

Time circuits

The time circuits are an integral part of the DeLorean time machine. They were built with an input device and a display. The display was divided into three sections: destination time (shown in red), present time (shown in green), and last time departed (shown in yellow), all annotated with Dymo labels. Each display includes a month, a day, a year, and the hour and minutes in that point in time. The years on the time circuits were limited to four digits and there were no possible negative years that could be reached, i.e. years before "0 A.D." (1 B.C.). This means the DeLorean could travel to any time from 12:00 am on January 1, 1 B.C. to 11:59 p.m. on December 31, A.D. 9999. It is unknown what would happen if one were to travel to the latter date since, after only one minute, it would be the year A.D. 10000 and the time circuits would no longer be able to show the present time.

The destination time display shows the date that the operator wants the DeLorean to go to (when the operator types in a date using the keypad in the DeLorean, it will be shown in the destination time display), the present time display shows the DeLorean's current location in time, and the last time departed display shows what point in time the DeLorean originally was after making a journey through time. Doc demonstrated its capabilities to Marty after its first test, giving two well-known but erroneous dates as examples: the signing of the Declaration of Independence, July 4, 1776; and the birth of Christ, December 25, 0000. He also used the day that he invented time travel, November 5, 1955.

During the second film, because of Biff Tannen's fiddling after he steals the DeLorean, the time circuits began malfunctioning, displaying January 1, 1885, in the destination time display. A bolt of lightning triggered the malfunction to send the DeLorean from 1955 to 1885. Though the vehicle was in mid-air, the spin created by the lightning bolt allowed it to reach 88 mph. Doc was trapped in 1885 and repairs were impossible because the time circuit control microchip, which powered the time circuits, was destroyed by the lightning bolt, and suitable replacement parts would not be invented until at least 1947. Doc placed repair instructions and a schematic diagram in the time machine to enable his 1955 counterpart to repair it using components from that era — which included vacuum tubes — before boarding it up within 
a silver mine. He then wrote Marty a letter explaining the situation and handed it over to Western Union, with instructions to deliver it to Marty in 1955.

Mr. Fusion

The Mr. Fusion Home Energy Reactor is the name of a power source used by the DeLorean time machine in the Back to the Future trilogy. It can be seen for the first time at the end of Back to the Future when Doc pulls into the McFly's driveway after a trip to the year 2015. It is a parody of Mr. Coffee machines, which were very popular at the time of filming. The appliance from which the prop was made was actually a Krups "Coffina" model coffee grinder.

The Mr. Fusion Home Energy Reactor converts household waste to power for the time machine's flux capacitor and time circuits using nuclear fusion, presumably cold fusion. In the film, Mr. Fusion allows the DeLorean time machine to generate the required 1.21 gigawatts needed to travel to any point in time. The energy produced by Mr. Fusion replaces plutonium as the primary power source of the DeLorean's time travel, allowing the characters to bypass the arduous power-generation requirements upon which the plot of the first film hinges. The plutonium fission reactor was most likely left installed underneath Mr. Fusion as a backup power source.

The Mr. Fusion can provide enough power to the flux capacitor and the time circuits, but is not used to power up the DeLorean itself, which makes use of an ordinary gasoline combustion engine to reach the 88 mph speed necessary for it to time travel. This limitation proved crucial in the third movie when Doc and Marty find themselves stuck in 1885 and unable to drive the DeLorean due to a punctured fuel line. The vehicle's hover system is powered by Mr. Fusion and is capable of bringing the DeLorean up to the required 88 mph; the combustion engine was also probably left on board as a backup. However, the flight systems were destroyed as a result of a lightning strike, leaving Marty to rely on the original combustion engine, which in turn was disabled.

Fictional timeline
For most of the first film, the 1.21 gigawatts are supplied by a plutonium-powered nuclear fission reactor and, with the absence of plutonium, a bolt of lightning channeled directly into the flux capacitor by a long pole and hook in the film's climactic sequence. At the end of the first film, and for the remainder of the trilogy, the plutonium nuclear reactor is replaced by a "Mr. Fusion Home Energy Reactor" generator possibly acquired in 2015. The "Mr. Fusion" device apparently converts household waste into electrical power; the name suggests nuclear fusion. Due to a "hover conversion" made in 2015, the car also becomes capable of hovering and flight, though it lost this ability at the end of the second film.

History
After purchasing the DeLorean (it is unknown who or where Doc bought it from) and modifying it into a time machine, Doc brought it to the Twin Pines Mall and tests it out by using a remote control to send it one minute into the future with his dog Einstein in it, leaving its license plate behind. He also shows Marty the major functions of the DeLorean: the flux capacitor, the time circuits, and the plutonium chamber that powers them. After refueling the time machine with plutonium stolen from Libyan terrorists (who previously stole the plutonium from a power plant), Doc prepares to travel into the future, but the Libyans unexpectedly arrive and shoot Doc. Marty uses the DeLorean to flee from the Libyans and is transported to 1955 after accidentally activating the time circuits, but without the plutonium that is needed to power it. Once there, Marty flees from Old Man Peabody (who thinks he's an alien), crushing one of his baby pine trees in the process, and stops in an undeveloped area. Due to problems with the starter and with the plutonium chamber empty, Marty is forced to hide the DeLorean behind a sign and cover it with branches to keep anyone from seeing it. Marty later shows it to 1955 Doc, who then has it brought back to his workshop. At one point, they had to cover the DeLorean with a tarp to keep Lorraine Baines, Marty's future mother, from seeing it.

Unable to obtain plutonium, Marty and 1955 Doc (after reading a 1985 flyer that Marty had with him following his trip to 1955) decide to harness the power of a lightning strike that will happen one week later to power the flux capacitor in order to send Marty back to 1985. Doc installs a cable leading from the top of the Hill Valley Courthouse (which is where the lightning will strike) down to the street as a means to harness the lightning strike and attaches a long pole and hook to the DeLorean to channel the lightning strike into the flux capacitor once the hook makes contact with the cable while the DeLorean is accelerating at 88 mph. He also places an alarm clock on the DeLorean's dashboard, which is set to ring to signal Marty to drive towards the cable at 88 mph. Doc brought the DeLorean (still covered under the tarp) to the Courthouse to make preparations. While doing this, a cop nearly discovers the time machine before Doc stops him, pretending that it is specialized weather sensing equipment. When the plan is put in motion, complications arise due to the DeLorean undergoing another starter problem and the cable being disconnected by a fallen branch. Despite these major setbacks, the plan succeeds, sending Marty back to 1985 ten minutes before his original departure; Marty had reset the DeLorean to return to 1985 earlier so he would have a chance to warn Doc of his upcoming death since 1955 Doc wouldn't listen to Marty's warnings. This event resulted in two DeLoreans existing in 1985 at the same time: one used by the new timeline’s Marty to escape from the Libyan terrorists and then disappearing to 1955 and the other appearing with the original Marty following his trip from 1955 to 1985.

After returning to 1985, the DeLorean once again suffers another starter problem, forcing Marty to run to the Twin Pines Mall (now called Lone Pine Mall due to Marty's actions in 1955). He arrives too late as Doc is gunned down and watches his counterpart escape to 1955 in the other DeLorean while the Libyans crash into a photo booth, but it is revealed that Doc's death was averted since he had listened to Marty's warning after all. After recovering the DeLorean (which apparently had its starter fixed) and taking Marty home, Doc travels to October 21, 2015, with Einstein, where he upgrades the DeLorean with 2015 technology (replacing the plutonium chamber with a Mr. Fusion Reactor, outfitting a barcode license plate on the back, and giving it the ability to fly), but briefly returns to 1985 to pick up Marty (who brings his girlfriend Jennifer Parker along) and get him to help stop his future son from committing a crime. While there, the DeLorean is stolen by Biff Tannen (who discovers that it's a time machine), who then travels back to November 12, 1955, the same day as the climax of the first film, to give his past self a sports almanac to be used for gambling; Marty planned taking the almanac back to his time earlier, but Doc does not allow it as he did not invent the time machine for that kind of purpose. Once Biff returns to 2015 without Doc knowing, Doc, Marty, Jennifer (who has fallen unconscious after seeing her future self), and Einstein return to 1985, but find themselves in an alternate timeline where Hill Valley is ruled by Biff that Doc describes as 1985A (alternate 1985). Because of Biff's tampering, the time circuits have malfunctioned, displaying random dates. After learning of 2015 Biff's actions, Marty and Doc travel back to 1955 to restore the timeline. Upon arrival, the DeLorean is hidden behind the same sign that Marty hid the DeLorean in the first film. During the mission, Marty had to wait for 2015 Biff to return to 2015 in his DeLorean in order to retrieve the almanac without 2015 Biff knowing and to prevent further changes to the timeline. Doc later uses the DeLorean to pick up Marty (accidentally switching on the malfunctioning time circuits) and chase down Biff, where they recover and destroy the almanac, but Doc is unable to land the DeLorean due to strong turbulence. It is struck by lightning again in the very same electrical storm, this time by accident.

According to writers Bob Gale and Robert Zemeckis, the lightning causes the DeLorean to spin at 88 miles per hour, and Doc later states in a letter to Marty that the bolt caused a "gigawatt overload" which "shorted out the time circuits and destroyed the flying circuits". The lightning strike causes the DeLorean to disappear from 1955, traveling back in time to January 1, 1885 (earlier in the film, Doc mentions that the time circuits are not functioning correctly; several instances in the film that show the destination time circuit displaying January 1, 1885, as the destination when the time circuits malfunctioned).

Once in 1885, the DeLorean is hidden in a mine because suitable replacement parts to replace its destroyed microchip will not be invented until 1947 (presumably referring to the transistor, invented in that year). 1955 Doc and Marty recover the DeLorean from the mine and 1955 Doc builds a vacuum tube circuit assembly to replace the destroyed microchip circuitry and restore the vehicle's time travel capabilities. The tires have disintegrated in storage, so 1955 Doc replaces them with whitewalls. The gasoline engine is still functional, but the flying circuits are not.

Due to the events in the first two films, a total of four DeLoreans existed at the same time in 1955: the first in 1955 Doc's lab (taking place during the events of the first film), the second hidden somewhere by 2015 Biff after stealing the DeLorean in 2015, the third used by Doc and Marty to travel to 1955 and undo the changes caused by 2015 Biff, and the fourth hidden in the mine, only existing after Doc is transported to 1885.

In a letter Doc wrote to Marty in 1885, Doc states he is happy in his new life there and requests that Marty not attempt to retrieve him, but instead to return to 1985 and destroy the DeLorean, believing that it has brought them and the world nothing but disaster. However, Marty and 1955 Doc learn of the tragedy that will come to Doc's way when he is murdered by Biff's grandfather, Buford "Mad Dog" Tannen, on September 7, 1885; therefore, 1955 Doc agrees to send Marty back to 1885 to rescue his future self. This resulted in two DeLoreans existing in 1885: the one hidden in the mine after Doc is sent to 1885 by the lightning strike, and the one that Marty uses to travel to 1885 to rescue Doc.

When Marty arrives in 1885, the DeLorean's fuel line is damaged while driving off-road during a Native American attack and is forced to hide it in a cave. He and Doc later recover it and patch up the line. When Clara Clayton came to see Doc, the DeLorean is once again hidden under a tarp so Clara cannot see it. They attempt to use whiskey as a replacement fuel, since commercial gasoline is not yet available; the test fails, destroying the fuel injection and ignition systems and leaving the car unable to travel under its own power. They try using horses as an alternate means to get the car up to 88 mph, but this fails since the horses' top speed is approximately 30 mph. They then decide to use a steam locomotive to push the DeLorean up to 88 mph. After speaking to the train engineer, they learn that in order for the locomotive to reach 88 mph, it would have to be on a straight track with a flat surface, with no cars coupled behind it, and with the boiler heated up to dangerous levels. After stealing the locomotive, Doc had his version of "Presto Logs" (pressed wood treated with anthracite) added to the boiler to provide the extra power needed to push the car up to 88 mph. Doc also replaces the 1955-style wheels with cast iron train wheels that fit on the track rails before loading the DeLorean onto the tracks and uses the old tires and a wooden support to cushion the locomotive's "cow catcher" and the car's rear end. Since each of the three "Presto Logs" fire at different intervals with increasing power, Doc installs a boiler temperature gauge on the DeLorean's dashboard to indicate when the car will experience a sudden burst of acceleration. Marty and Doc make the run on a flat, straight section of track leading to an unfinished bridge over Shonash Ravine (which would have been renamed Clayton Ravine if Marty and Doc have not saved Clara from falling in earlier); once the car reaches 88 mph, the Mr. Fusion unit provides the power required to activate the flux capacitor and make the jump through time. Upon reaching the end of the track, the DeLorean disappears to 1985 with Marty (with Doc staying behind with Clara) while the locomotive falls down the cliff and is destroyed in the explosion.

When the DeLorean makes its final trip to 1985, it lands on the now-completed bridge and crosses over Shonash Ravine (now called Eastwood Ravine due to the townsfolk believing that Clint Eastwood, the name that Marty used in 1885, fell in and was killed) before coasting to a stop. Marty bails out seconds before it is struck and destroyed by an oncoming freight train. Later, Doc, Clara, and their children: Jules and Verne, appear in the same location where the DeLorean was destroyed, piloting a new time machine in the form of a steam-powered train. After picking up Einstein, the couple and their children depart for an unknown time period.

Other elements

In the films, the DeLorean time machine is a licensed, registered vehicle in the state of California, where the films take place. The vanity license plate used in the film reads "OUTATIME", a deliberate anomaly, as the maximum number of symbols on California plates is seven characters. When Doc returns from 2015, it is a barcode license plate, which implies that by that year license plates have moved to other more sophisticated means of tracking and registering.

Animated series
In The Animated Series, Doc builds another DeLorean into a time machine, restoring most of its features, including Mr. Fusion and the hover conversion (Doc either rebuilds the one destroyed at the end of Part III or he simply builds a new one). He also seemingly adds the capability to travel through space in addition to time (i.e., appear at a different location from the one it departed), similar to the TARDIS from Doctor Who. The cartoon DeLorean time machine has many add-ons, including a back seat in normal two-door mode, the ability to transform into a four-door, a pop-out covered wagon top, a blimp, a rear video screen, and a voice activated time input.

Back to the Future: The Game
Back to the Future: The Game features a chronal duplicate of the original DeLorean, which Doc Brown recovered from the timestream after the destruction of the original. This DeLorean is created at the end of Back to the Future Part II; when the original time machine was struck by lightning: while the DeLorean itself is sent to 1885, a fully functional duplicate appears (apparently unmanned and undamaged) in 2025, where Doc retrieves it with the Time Train before Griff Tannen could. This Clone DeLorean is effectively the same as the Part II one, including the occasional glitches in the time circuits (mostly affecting the last time departed time display), but with a new automatic retrieval feature that automatically brings the Clone DeLorean to a set time and location of Doc's choosing every time Doc doesn't return to the car in a fixed amount of time. The original DeLorean made a brief appearance in Marty Mcfly's nightmare where Doc sends it one minute into the future, which copies the events of the first film. The only difference is that it does not return from its one-minute trip.

The Clone DeLorean appears outside of Doc's house after Marty recovers Doc's notebook from Biff Tannen. Inside is Einstein, a tape recorder with a message from Doc that tells Marty about the automatic retrieval system, and a mysterious shoe. After learning that Doc is stuck somewhere in time, he activates the time circuits, but the last time departed time display is faulty, forcing Marty to use Einstein and the shoe to find out Doc's whereabouts. He eventually learns that Doc is in 1931 and will be killed by Irving "Kid" Tannen, Biff's father. Marty travels to 1931, one day before Doc's death, appearing in the middle of a police chase (the glitch in the time circuits is resolved after the police car bumps into the Clone DeLorean). After getting away from the police, he hides the Clone DeLorean behind a sign. 

After rescuing Doc, they prepare to return to 1986, but Marty discovers that he is disappearing; it turns out his grandfather Artie Mcfly will be killed by Kid as a result of Marty's earlier actions. Upon being caught by Officer Danny Parker, Marty swipes the DeLorean keys and travels several hours back (with Doc staying behind) to rescue Artie from Kid to ensure his existence before he and Doc return to 1986, but find themselves in a dystopian future which was brought into existence due to Kid not being arrested. Marty and Doc return to 1931 to correct the timeline (Doc hides the DeLorean in the DeSoto Lot to ensure that no one can find it and later uses it to get Einstein down from the Courthouse), but their actions resulted in the creation of a second dystopian future, with Doc disappearing from existence.

After returning to 1986, Marty crashes the Clone DeLorean into a billboard and after he gets out (breaking the window in the process), the Clone DeLorean falls through the billboard and crashes onto the ground, becoming badly damaged. Marty uses one of its wheels and a battery to get over a nearby wall. The Clone DeLorean is later restored by an alternate version of Doc Brown (who took six months to repair it) who has never developed time travel technology, having access to limited notes about the flux capacitor. After traveling six months back in time, he picks up Marty and they return to 1931. As such, the time circuits of the alternate Clone DeLorean become even more glitchy (resulting in them arriving two months late), accumulating errors as severe as the interval of time traveled, with increasing damage with every time travel attempt: as such, Citizen Brown, the alternate version of Doc, has to install a diagnostic console made of materials available in 1931 (appearing as a plywood box with a diagnostic lightbulb and three similar bulbs placed on the coils on the outer body).

Apparently, part of the problem is chromium parts becoming unstable during time travel, according to Citizen Brown. After a falling out between the duo, Citizen Brown leaves in the alternate Clone DeLorean and picks up Edna Strickland, one of the game's main villains, having decided to have her help change his younger self's career after learning of Edna's unhappy future. Marty foils their attempts, leading Edna to steal the alternate Clone DeLorean with Officer Parker in pursuit. The original Doc arrives in the original Clone DeLorean as Citizen Brown disappears from existence due to earlier events in the game; i.e., because Marty restored the original timeline (the events of all three films), the original Doc and Clone DeLorean are brought back into existence. Officer Parker nearly arrests Marty and Doc for allegedly having the car that Edna got away in. After they explain to him that there is more than one DeLorean, Marty explains to Doc that the alternate Clone DeLorean had malfunctioning time circuits. To make matters worse, the entire town of Hill Valley disappears around them; Edna had unwillingly time traveled to 1876. They go to "Mary Pickford's" house and see that the alternate Clone DeLorean had been destroyed. After they get information from Mary, who was really Edna, they go to 1876. After they stop the fire that would've burned down Hill Valley, they chase down Edna, who is trying to get away in the alternate Clone DeLorean. Marty hoverboards to Edna's DeLorean and synchronizes the two DeLoreans by attaching signal dishes called flux synchronizers over the diagnostic lightbulbs on Edna's DeLorean and pointing them at the receiving dish on Doc's DeLorean (which was apparently attached to its front hood recently), which is flying behind the one that Edna is driving. While doing this, Edna unsuccessfully tries to shake Marty off as he moves around her DeLorean. Their actions result in Edna's DeLorean suffering minor damages: the rear mirror being damaged, one of its windshield wipers being torn off, and the Mr. Fusion Reactor being knocked open (although Marty manages to close it). Once Marty finishes this task, he returns to Doc's DeLorean as they begin their return to 1931, activating the flux capacitor on Edna's DeLorean and making it speed up to 88 mph with its time circuits set to 1931. After they all return to 1931, Edna crashes in front of the police station and is then arrested by Officer Parker for her crimes. Edna's DeLorean then vanishes because of the time ripples catching up with them, causing "chronal decay" (i.e., since Citizen Brown's timeline ceased to exist, the alternate Clone DeLorean was erased from existence). Marty and Doc return to 1986, where three DeLoreans (one normal, one blue, and one black) suddenly arrive with different versions of Marty. The duo leave the Martys arguing before departing to an unknown time in their own DeLorean.

It is implied that the Time Train stays with Clara, Jules, and Verne, passingly mentioned as enjoying the same nomadic life around the time-stream of Doc, but it is never seen in the game.

Back to the Future: The Ride
In Back to the Future: The Ride, Doc, who now lives in a lab called the Institute of Future Technology, had created an 8-passenger DeLorean that can fly just like the original DeLorean (which can be seen in the ride and in the outside display) and the Time Train (which can only be seen in display outside of the attraction). Unlike the original DeLorean, the flux capacitor is in the front of the cockpit along with a small screen, the time circuits, the keypad, and the speedometer. It is also equipped with a sub-ether time-tracking scanner that allows Doc to pinpoint the location of the original DeLorean in time. The original DeLorean is shown to have its original "OUTATIME" license plate instead of the bar code license plate, but it could just mean that this DeLorean is actually a new one being built into a time machine. Doc can be seen traveling in the original DeLorean in the ride's queue videos. In the attraction, Biff Tannen (who stowed away in one of the institute's time machines that had recently visited 1955) steals the original DeLorean, prompting Doc to send the riders to the 8-passenger DeLorean and use it to go after Biff. The ride begins with the 8-passenger DeLorean traveling to 2015 Hill Valley where it chases Biff across the town. Biff and the riders then travel to the ice age where the 8-passenger DeLorean experiences a temporally engine failure after Biff causes an avalanche that damages it. The 8-passenger DeLorean catches up to Biff in the Cretaceous Period. Biff's DeLorean gets damaged by a T-Rex and lands in a volcano while the T-Rex swallows the 8-passenger DeLorean, but spits it back out. The 8-passenger DeLorean lands in the lava and follows Biff as he goes over a cliff. The riders then bump into him, sending both DeLoreans back to 1991. In a post-credits scene, Clara Clayton, who has built the Time Train with Doc, reveals to have currently repaired the DeLorean and travels back to 1947 to a farm.

Doc Brown Saves the World
In Doc Brown Saves the World, there was a repaired DeLorean time machine which included new replacement parts from 2015. The DeLorean is also seen in a video promoting Doc Brown Saves the World, and it is unknown as to whether or not a flux capacitor was inside.

Time Train
The Time Train was a second time machine that appears at the end of Part III, which is powered by steam instead of gasoline. Doc built it out of a steam locomotive.
It homages the submarine Nautilus from Jules Verne's novel Twenty Thousand Leagues Under the Seas. It took Doc ten years to build it. The flux capacitor is inside the chimney headlamp at the front of the locomotive. The time circuits appear as rotating dials that are identical to the DeLorean's time circuits, though are not clearly seen in the film. The sides of the cabin (which display Doc's initials: ELB) are capable of opening the same way as the DeLorean's gullwing doors, but can also deploy stairs that allow people to climb on board. Its tender also has vents which function the same way as the DeLorean's. How Doc was able to create the flux capacitor and time circuits for the Time Train in 1885 is unexplained, but it is assumed that Doc used parts from the hoverboard that Marty left behind in 1885 and the broken DeLorean that was buried in the mine to build them (all while ensuring that Marty and his 1955 counterpart would be able to repair it). Unlike the DeLorean, the external components of the Time Train were symmetrical on both sides of the vehicle, possibly representing a more sophisticated grasp of the time travel technology on Doc's part, despite being constructed from more primitive materials. Interestingly, before the Time Train appeared in 1985, it triggered the bells and gates on the nearby railroad crossing as if another train was coming. This could mean that the Time Train is so powerful that it enables a connection with its destination time even before arriving to that point of time.

Following its completion and its first time travel test, Doc and his family traveled to 2015 and beyond to give it a hover conversion, allowing it to fly just like the DeLorean. When Doc returned to 1985 to pick up Einstein and meet up with Marty and Jennifer, he chose the most likely place that they might be at that given time, the site of the DeLorean's destruction. After introducing his sons, Jules and Verne, and giving Marty a picture of him and Doc in 1885, Doc activates the train's flying capabilities and departs to an unknown time.

Cars used in filming
Universal Studios special effects department built three main DeLorean time machines for the movie Back to the Future. The film's producers characterized the DeLoreans with three names: the A car, B car, and C car.

The "A" car, also known as the Hero car, was the most detailed and utilized vehicle during production. After filming was over, the "A" car was delivered to Universal Studios Hollywood as an attraction piece. As time passed, visitors started taking parts off the vehicle and wandering off with them. Bob Gale selected a team to repair the car so it could be in a perfect condition. The vehicle is currently being displayed at the Petersen Automotive Museum in Los Angeles.

The "B" car, also known as the Stunt Car used in all three movies, was mainly used for stunts. After purposely being struck by a train during production, the car was left as a pile of rubble. Movie car customizer Jay Ohrberg used the "B" car wreckage to construct various DeLorean replicas. The "B" car's body panels were sold to Planet Hollywood Hawaii, where it was hooked up on the ceiling of the restaurant until its shutdown in 2010. The car was sold at auction to Bill and Patrick Shea after Back to the Future HQ reached out to Planet Hollywood to find the car's remains. The stunt car is currently being displayed at Hubbardston, Massachusetts.

The "C" car was used for interior footage and was torn apart so the camera could fit inside the car. The vehicle was left at Universal Studios Hollywood, many of its parts were put together on a replica remodeled by Tom Talmon Studios for Universal Japan. Universal Japan sold the car to a private company and the vehicle is currently being displayed on the company's entryway.

There were three extra DeLoreans used through the production of the sequels. The fiberglass car used on special effects was reportedly destroyed. The stunt train, better known as The Oxnard Car, was displayed in Universal Studios, Florida, from the early 1990s to 2020. The studio decided to replace the original car with a replica to be stored for restoration. The desert car with the blue cross over tube was left at Universal Studios Hollywood; Tom Talmon Studios used parts of this car on a replica displayed on Universal Japan. After Japanese workers stole some of the car props, ScreenUsed acquired the car for restoration and then settled the car for auction. Bill and Patrick Shea ended up buying it, and they placed the car on display at Hubbardston, Massachusetts.

Development

The time machine went through several variations during production of the first film, Back to the Future. In the first draft of the screenplay, the time machine was a laser device that was housed in a room; at the end of the draft the device was attached to a refrigerator and taken to a nuclear bomb test. Spielberg vetoed the idea, concerned that children might attempt to climb into one. Zemeckis suggested the DeLorean because it offered mobility, a unique design, and would appear like an alien UFO to a 1950s family due to its characteristic gullwing doors (which were inspired by the Mercedes-Benz 300 SL). The original ending of the 1985 film Back to the Future was to have Marty outrun a nuclear explosion at a test site to power the DeLorean's flux capacitor in order to travel back to 1985. However, during the movie's filming, it went over budget and behind schedule, and Universal refused to grant the producers more money, as it couldn't afford the desert location to shoot such scenario. Ultimately, the power source was changed to the lightning strike at the clock tower in Hill Valley as a result.

The DeLorean was developed under the supervision of Lawrence Paull, who designed it with artist Ron Cobb and illustrator Andrew Probert. They intended for the vehicle to look fixed together from common parts. The Ford Motor Company offered $75,000 to use a Ford Mustang instead; Gale responded that "Doc Brown doesn't drive a fucking Mustang". Michael Fink was hired as the art department liaison and tasked with realizing Cobb's sketches and overseeing the car's construction. Paull and Canton, who had worked with him on Blade Runner (1982) and Buckaroo Banzai (1984), respectively, recruited him. Fink had a project lined up but agreed to help in the free weeks he had remaining.

Three DeLoreans used were purchased from a collector—one for stunts, one for special effects, and one for normal shots. They were unreliable and often broke down.  was chosen as the time travel speed because it was easy to remember and looked "cool" on the speedometer. A custom speedometer was built to simulate 88mph, as a 1979 law passed by then-President Jimmy Carter had limited speedometers to 85mph to reduce speeding. The Flux Capacitor, necessary for time travel, was called the Temporal Field Capacitor; Zemeckis said the name was not believable. From his work on the 1979 drama The China Syndrome, Fink had learned of Neutron flux. He and Zemeckis simultaneously suggested renaming it the Flux Capacitor. Cobb and Probert had already placed the Flux Capacitor on the external and interior roof of the DeLorean. Fink placed it next to the driver. Fink constructed the device using a NEMA box and backlit Torr High-Voltage relays. The time display was constructed from LMB boxes. When Fink left, he picked Michael Scheffe to replace him. Scheffe finished the Flux Capacitor build and built the "Mr. Fusion" replacement power supply out of a Krups coffee grinder.

Months were spent building the model from epoxy, steel, and aluminum. Halogen lamps were fitted to the tires to simulate thrusters; the tires were made from aluminum to withstand the heat. Blue chalk was rubbed on the windscreen to conceal the lack of riders— the last effect produced by ILM.

The act of the DeLorean traveling through time is referred to as the "time slice" effect. Zemeckis only knew that he wanted it to be a violent transition. He described it like a "Neanderthal sitting on the hood of the DeLorean and chipping away the fabric of time in front of him". He suggested a crack in time opening before the car, but animators could not determine what would be on the reverse of the opening visible to the audience. An electrical effect enveloping the car was abandoned because a similar process had been used in the science fiction film The Terminator (1984). Other ideas included a wave of energy that moved over the car before exploding and blowing open a hole in time, and a "cubist" effect where the car would break into separate segments, each individually expanding in proportion before disappearing. Takahashi developed artwork showing the segments popping out from the DeLorean and glowing. Gale liked the effect, but Zemeckis did not; Spielberg found it unrealistic.

Takahashi animated separate effects like contrails and flashing lights; Zemeckis opted to use them all. The effects were drawn in black and white and optically manipulated afterward. This resulted in the DeLorean appearing to emit various effects that strike in front of the car to create an explosion that opens the time slice. This was combined with practical effects including smoke, sparks, and flash-bulbs. Fire emitting from the tires was intended to start the sequence but the gas jet mechanism repeatedly failed; it only functioned for two of the six shots required. Peggy Regan animated flames and reflections for consistency. The trails of fire left behind the DeLorean were practical, but the actual movement was slow. The footage was sped up and smoke added where the car disappeared. Fox and Lloyd were filmed against a reflective mylar blue screen set to match the car park's wet surface and composited into the trails of fire. Reflections of the actors were matte paintings filmed through a ripple glass to add texture. A stuntman in a dog suit portrays Doc's dog when in the moving car. It was suggested that the DeLorean emerge from the time slice in sections that slam into each preceding section. Norwood and Charlie Mullen outlined an animation and Ellen Lichtwardt animated a glow to the vehicle. The effect is so quick as to be imperceptible. Zemeckis preferred this as he did not want the audience to think too much about how everything worked.

Different parts from three 1982 DeLoreans were used in the first film. Liquid nitrogen was poured onto the car for scenes after it had traveled through time to give the impression that it was cold. The base for the nuclear reactor was made from the hubcap from a Dodge Polara. Aircraft parts and blinking lights were added for effect. In one of the first scenes, carbon dioxide extinguishers were hidden inside the DeLorean to simulate the exhaust effect. Ultimately, five real DeLoreans were used in the filming of the trilogy, plus one "process" car built for interior shots. In the off-road scenes in the third film, a modified-for-off-road VW Beetle frame was fitted to the DeLorean with the whitewall tires and baby Moon hubcaps. A seventh DeLorean was also used in the filming, but this one was merely a full-sized, fiberglass model used for exterior shots where the vehicle hovers above the set as well as when the actors interact with the vehicle.

While the original PRV V6 engines were retained in the physical cars for filming, the film's sound effects artists used the sound of a Porsche 928 V8 and the Star Wars'''s landspeeder for the engine sounds in the movie.

Replicas

As of November 2021, approximately 122 DeLoreans are known to be converted to Back to the Future Time Machines.
In popular culture
The Spanish public broadcaster RTVE has a TV program dedicated to history vulgarization named  ("The Flux Capacitor") after the film prop.
 is a mistranslation of "flux" that appeared in the Spanish dubbing of the first film and stuck.
Within the program, there is a game in which viewers have to find which out of four historical assertion is false (named "the ").

References

Sources
 Boyd, Matt. "The Back to the Future DeLorean" in DieCastX Magazine, Spring 2007, p. 98.
 De Santis, Solange. "Steven Spielberg Builds a Time Machine" in Popular Mechanics, August 1985, pp. 84–87, 132.
 Iaccino, James F. Jungian Reflections within the Cinema: A Psychological Analysis of Sci-Fi and Fantasy Archetypes, pp. 81–89. Greenwood Publishing Group, 1998. 
 Kaku, Michio. Physics of the Impossible: A Scientific Exploration Into the World of Phasers, Force Fields, Teleportation, and Time Travel. Random House, Inc., 2008. 
 McDermid, Val. A Suitable Job for a Woman: Inside the World of Women Private Eyes. Poisoned Pen Press, 1999. 
 Mowbray, Scott. "Let's Do the Time Warp Again" in Popular Science, March 2002, pp. 46–51.
 Nahin, Paul J. Time Machines: Time Travel in Physics, Metaphysics, and Science Fiction. Springer, 1999. 
 Ní Fhlainn, Sorcha. The Worlds of Back to the Future: Critical Essays on the Films. McFarland, 2010. 
 Redmond, Sean. Liquid Metal: the Science Fiction Film Reader, pp. 115–122. Wallflower Press, 2004. .
 Simpson, Philip; Utterson, Andrew; Shepherdson, Karen J. Film Theory: Critical Concepts in Media and Cultural Studies, Volume 2. Taylor & Francis, 2004. 
 Sobchack, Vivian Carol. Screening Space: the American Science Fiction Film''. Rutgers University Press, 1997.

External links
 

Back to the Future (franchise) technology
Time travel devices
Fictional aircraft
Fictional cars
Hovercraft
Electric vehicles
Flying cars in fiction
Fictional elements introduced in 1985